Kawoosa Khalisa is a village in the Narbal Block of Budgam district in the Indian union territory of Jammu and Kashmir. It is 16 km west of Budgam and 10 km from the state capital, Srinagar. Located on Srinagar-Gulmarg Highway. Kawoosa Khalisa is bordered to the west by Breng Block, to the north by Wakura Block, to the east by Pattan Block, and to the south by Badgam Block.

Demographics 
The primary languages are Kashmiri and Urdu.

Education 
Nearby colleges include  Govt. Degree College Magam,  Govt. Degree College Bemina, and Govt. Degree College Beerwah.

There are two public schools: 
1. Hanfia Anglo Arabic Modern Public School Kawoosa Khalisa. 
2.  Sheikh Ul Aalam Public Model High School Kawoosa Khalisa.
There are two government schools:
1. Govt. Boys High School
2. Govt. Girls Middle School

Recently online Educational Academy has been started by one of the teacher(Parvaiz Ahmad Malik) from Sheikh Ul Aalam Public Model High School Kawoosa Khalisa (http://parvaizeducationalacademy.blogspot.com/) (https://www.youtube.com/channel/UCP7VF2Bl0Grxr-HlrPZtnUw).

kawoosa khalisa has rich heritage like aasthan aaliya adjacent to nala sukhnag.
.

References 

Jammu and Kashmir